The Mayor of Lancaster, Pennsylvania, is the elected, chief executive of the city of Lancaster, Pennsylvania, USA. The mayor is elected for a four-year term. The city of Lancaster, Pennsylvania has had 43 mayors since 1818.

Mayors of Lancaster

References